Steven Fred Lawson (born June 14, 1945) is a noted historian of the Civil Rights Movement in the United States. Born in the Bronx, New York, he is the son of Ceil Parker Lawson, a housewife, and Murray Lawson, a retail hardware clerk. He had a sister, Lona Lawson Mirchin, who died in 2004.  After teaching at various colleges and universities for forty years, he is now retired, works as an independent scholar, and shares a home in New Jersey with his wife Nancy A. Hewitt and their miniature poodle, Scooter (named after 1950s New York Yankees star and broadcaster Phil Rizzuto).

List of works

Books
(2012) (with Nancy A. Hewitt)
(2009) One America in the Twenty-first Century: The Report of President Bill Clinton’s Initiative on Race. New Haven, Yale University Press
(2004) To Secure These Rights: President Harry S Truman’s Committee on Civil Rights Boston: Bedford-St. Martin’s.
(2003) 
(2003) Co-authors  
(1998) Co-author 
(1997) 
(1985) 
(1976)

Journals

"Freedom Then, Freedom Now: The Historiography of the Civil Rights Movement," American Historical Review, 96 (April 1991): 456-  71.
Race and Reapportionment, 1962: The Case of Georgia Senate Redistricting, Journal of Policy History, 12(Summer, 2000):   1-28(co-author with Peyton McCrary).

Newspapers

Lawson, Steven F. (November 9, 2008) "What It Meant: The Election of Barack Obama," The Boston Globe.

References

External links
Faculty page at Rutgers University
Declaration of Steven F. Lawson, Ph.D. Case No.: 1:13-CV-861 From the case United States of America vs. The State Of North Carolina; The North Carolina State Board of Elections; and Kim W. Strach held in the United States District Court for the Middle District of North Carolina

21st-century American historians
21st-century American male writers
1945 births
Living people
Historians of the civil rights movement
American male non-fiction writers